Social parasitism was a political crime in the Soviet Union in which the perpetrator was accused of living at the expense of other people or society. A number of Soviet intellectuals and dissidents were accused of the crime of parasitism, including Joseph Brodsky, Iosif Begun, Vladimir Voinovich, Lev Kopelev and Andrei Amalrik.

Soviet Union 

In the Soviet Union, which declared itself a workers' state, every adult able-bodied person was expected to work until official retirement. Thus unemployment was officially and theoretically eliminated. Those who refused to work, study or serve in another way risked being criminally charged with social parasitism ( tuneyadstvo, тунеядцы [tuneyadets/tuneyadtsy"), in accordance with the socialist principle "from each according to his ability, to each according to his contribution."

In 1961, 130,000 people were identified as leading the "anti-social, parasitic way of life" in the Russian Soviet Federative Socialist Republic. Charges of parasitism were frequently applied to dissidents and refuseniks, many of whom were intellectuals. Since their writings were considered anti-establishment, the state prevented them from obtaining employment. To avoid trials for parasitism, many of them took unskilled (but not especially time-consuming) jobs (street sweepers, boiler room attendants, etc.), which allowed them to continue their other pursuits.

For example, the Russian poet Joseph Brodsky was charged with social parasitism by the Soviet authorities. A 1964 trial found that his series of odd jobs and role as a poet were not a sufficient contribution to society.

Belarus 
Policies introduced in 2015, which observers noted as being reminiscent of Soviet-era initiatives, included a tax for those who were considered "social parasites". Defined as people working under 183 days in a year, and excluding home-makers and subsistence farmers, the deployment of the so-called parasite tax has been suspended after protests in several major urban centers.

Romania 

The communist regime of Nicolae Ceaușescu criminalized social parasitism by decree in 1970. The regime viewed young people as potentially destabilizing, and targeted those who did not fit into socialist norms. Citizens could be stopped if they were found on the street during hours when they should have been at work or school. Penalties were imprisonment for one to six months, or a fine of 1000 to 5000 lei. Indecent or obscene gestures or words carried penalties of 20 days to three months in prison, or a fine of up to 2000 lei.

A 1976 law broadened the campaign against parasitism. It stated that if someone able to work refused a job, he could be forced by court order to work for one year on construction sites, farms, in forests or factories. The Miliția was tasked with enforcing the measures, and its actions were often arbitrary.

See also
 Coercion
 Economy of the Soviet Union
 From each according to his ability, to each according to his needs
 Refusal of work
 To each according to his contribution
 Work ethic

References

Political slurs for people
Political repression in the Soviet Union
Soviet phraseology
Russian criminal law
Anti-intellectualism
Persecution of intellectuals